Dobbs County, North Carolina was a county located in the U.S. state of North Carolina.

History
Dobbs County was formed in 1758 from Johnston County, though the legislative act that created it did not become effective until April 10, 1759. It was named for Arthur Dobbs, governor of North Carolina from 1754 until 1764. In 1779 the western part became Wayne County; the county seat was moved from its original location on Walnut Creek to the town of Kingston, which was renamed Kinston in 1784. Because the name Dobbs reminded the population of the colonial past, in 1791 it was divided by the North Carolina legislature into Glasgow County (later renamed Greene County) and Lenoir County; it ceased to exist.

See also

List of counties in North Carolina
List of former United States counties

References

Further reading

 
 
 
 
 
 

 
Arthur Dobbs
1758 establishments in the Thirteen Colonies
1791 disestablishments in North Carolina
Former counties of North Carolina